UFMS may refer to:

Federal Migration Service
Federal University of Mato Grosso do Sul